Mathematics is a broad subject that is commonly divided in many areas that may be defined by their objects of study, by the used methods, or by both. For example, analytic number theory is a subarea of number theory devoted to the use of methods of analysis for the study of natural numbers.

This glossary is alphabetically sorted. This hides a large part of the relationships between areas. For the broadest areas of mathematics, see . The Mathematics Subject Classification is a hierarchical list of areas and subjects of study that has been elaborated by the community of mathematicians. It is used by most publishers for classifying mathematical articles and books.

A

B

C

D

E

F

G

H

I

J

K

L

M

N

O

P

Q

R

S

T

U

V

W

See also
 Lists of mathematics topics
 Outline of mathematics
 :Category:Glossaries of mathematics

References 

Areas of mathematics
Areas of mathematics
Wikipedia glossaries using description lists